Ambah Assembly constituency is one of the 230 Vidhan Sabha (Legislative Assembly) constituencies of Madhya Pradesh state in central India. This constituency is reserved for the candidates belonging to the Scheduled castes This constituency came into existence in 1951, as one of the 79 Vidhan Sabha constituencies of the erstwhile Madhya Bharat state.

Ambah (constituency number 8) is one of the six Vidhan Sabha constituencies located in Morena district. This constituency covers the entire Porsa tehsil, part of Ambah tehsil and Ambah municipality.

Ambah is part of Morena Lok Sabha constituency.

Members of Legislative Assembly
As a constituency of Madhya Bharat:
 1951: Jamuna Prasad Singh Tomar and Chandana, both from the Indian National Congress

As a constituency of Madhya Pradesh:
 1963: Mahendra Singh Babuji, Indian National Congress
 1985: Ramnarayan Sakhavar, Indian National Congress
 1998: Banshilal Jatav, Bharatiya Janata Party
 2003: Banshilal Jatav, Bharatiya Janata Party
 2008: Kamlesh Jatav, Bharatiya Janata Party
 2013: Satya Prakash Sakhvar, Bahujan Samaj Party
2018: Kamlesh Jatav, Indian National Congress

See also
 Ambah

References

Morena district
Assembly constituencies of Madhya Pradesh